John F. Kennedy High School is a public high school in San Antonio, Texas, United States. It was established in 1963 and is part of the Edgewood Independent School District.

History 
John F. Kennedy High School was established in 1963. President Kennedy visited San Antonio on November 21, 1963, and promised to return and dedicate the new John F. Kennedy High School. He was assassinated in Dallas the following day.

Notable alumni 
 John Garza, congressman
 Heriberto Hernandez, United States Coast Guard fireman

References

External links 
 

High schools in San Antonio
Edgewood Independent School District (Bexar County, Texas) high schools
Educational institutions established in 1963
1963 establishments in Texas